MACA or maca can mean:

 Maca (plant)

Places

Geography
 Maca District, Peru
 Cerro Macá, stratovolcano in the Aisén Region of Chile
 Maca River, Romania

Outer space
 5228 Máca, a minor planet

People
 Alain Maca (born 1950), Belgian-American retired soccer player
 Joe Maca (1920-1982), American soccer player
 Dragan Marinković (actor) (born 1968), Bosnian and Serbian actor and TV personality

MACA
 Military Aid to the Civil Authorities, a collective term used by the Ministry of Defence of the United Kingdom
 Multiple Access with Collision Avoidance, a protocol used in wireless LAN data transmission
 Mongol-American Cultural Association
 Alicante Museum of Contemporary Art (in Spanish Museo de Arte Contemporáneo de Alicante), in Alicante, Spain
 Together: Working for Well-being, a UK charity formerly known as the Mental After Care Association
 Make America Crip Again, a 2017 EP by Snoop Dogg

See also
 Macas (disambiguation)
 Maka (disambiguation)

Movimiento de Arte y Cultura Latino Americana (MACLA) museum in San Jose, California with a focus on Latinx visual and performing arts and community engagement.